Hypericum bellum is a species of flowering plant in the family Hypericaceae. It is a shrub known as mei li jin si tao in Chinese. It comes from the Sichuan, Xizang, and Yunnan regions of China, as well as India. It is a  dense plant with downy leaves that grows up to a meter (39 inches) tall.

References

bellum
Flora of China
Flora of East Himalaya